A low-surface-brightness galaxy, or LSB galaxy, is a diffuse galaxy with a surface brightness that, when viewed from Earth, is at least one magnitude lower than the ambient night sky.

Most LSBs are dwarf galaxies, and most of their baryonic matter is in the form of neutral gaseous hydrogen, rather than stars. They appear to have over 95% of their mass as non-baryonic dark matter. There appears to be little supernova (SN) activity in these galaxies, although LSB galaxy IC 217 hosted  2014cl.

Rotation curve measurements indicate an extremely high mass-to-light ratio, meaning that stars and luminous gas contribute only very little to the overall mass balance of an LSB. The centers of LSBs show no large overdensities in stars, unlike e.g. the bulges of normal spiral galaxies. Therefore, they seem to be dark-matter-dominated even in their centers, which makes them excellent laboratories for the study of dark matter.

In comparison to the high-surface-brightness galaxies, LSBs are mainly isolated field galaxies, found in regions devoid of other galaxies. In their past, they had fewer tidal interactions or mergers with other galaxies, which could have triggered enhanced star formation. This is an explanation for the small stellar content.

LSB galaxies were theorized to exist in 1976 by Mike Disney.

Giant low-surface-brightness galaxies
Giant low surface brightness (GLSB) galaxies are among the most massive known spiral galaxies in the Universe. They have very faint stellar disks that are very rich in neutral hydrogen but low in star formation and thus low in surface brightness. Such galaxies often have bright bulges that can host low luminosity active galactic nuclei. GLSB galaxies are usually isolated systems that rarely interact with other galaxies. The first LSB galaxy verified to exist was Malin 1, discovered in 1986. As such, it was also the first giant LSB galaxy identified. At the time of its discovery, it was the largest spiral galaxy known (by scale-length measurement).

UGC 1382 was previously thought to be an elliptical galaxy, but low-brightness spiral arms were later detected. UGC 1382 is much closer to Earth than Malin 1.

Examples 

 Andromeda V
  Pegasus Dwarf Spheroidal Galaxy 

 IC 10
 NGC 45
 Eridanus II
 Malin 1
 Malin 2
 Phoenix Dwarf
 Sagittarius Dwarf Irregular Galaxy (SagDIG)
 Sextans A
 Sextans B

 Wolf–Lundmark–Melotte galaxy (WLM)
 UGC 477

See also
 Ultra diffuse galaxy

References

K. O'Neil, The HI Content and Extent of Low Surface Brightness Galaxies - Could LSB Galaxies be Responsible for Damped Ly-alpha Absorption?. For publication in Extragalactic Gas at Low Redshift, by Mulchaey, et al., eds (2001).
S.D. Rosenbaum and D.J. Bomans, The environment of Low Surface Brightness Galaxies. Astronomy & Astrophysics Letters, 422, 5-8 (2004).
A.J. Barth, A normal stellar disk in the galaxy Malin 1.   Astronomical Journal 133, 1085-1091 (2007).